Holly Christina McNamara (born 23 January 2003) is an Australian soccer player who plays for Melbourne City FC in the A-League Women and the Australia women's national soccer team (the Matildas).

Early life
McNamara grew up in NSW and played for FNSW Institute in New South Wales.

Club career
In December 2021, McNamara made her A-League Women debut for Melbourne City FC in a 1–0 win over Canberra United FC, starting the match and playing the full 90 minutes, along with scoring the game's only goal. In February, McNamara suffered a ruptured anterior cruciate ligament injury in a match against Sydney FC, which ended her debut season.

International career
In 2018, McNamara was a part of the Junior Matildas team ahead of their 2019 AFC U-16 Women's Championship qualification campaign, however she tore her ACL before she had the chance to make her debut for the side.

After an impactful first five games for Melbourne City FC in the A-League Women, McNamara was called up by the Matildas for the first time. Participating in a training camp ahead of the 2022 AFC Women's Asian Cup.

References 

2003 births
Melbourne City FC (A-League Women) players
Australian women's soccer players
Living people
A-League Women players
Women's association footballers not categorized by position
Australia women's international soccer players
Sportswomen from New South Wales
Soccer players from New South Wales